Luciferian Towers (sometimes stylized as "Luciferian Towers") is the sixth studio album by Canadian post-rock band Godspeed You! Black Emperor, released on 22 September 2017 by Constellation Records

Background
According to the Constellation Records one sheet about the album, Luciferian Towers was made "in the midst of communal mess, raising dogs and children. Eyes up and filled with dreadful joy – we aimed for wrong notes that explode, a quiet muttering amplified heavenward. We recorded it all in a burning motorboat." A list of "grand demands" also accompanied the information about the album, including:
 an end to foreign invasion
 an end to borders
 the total dismantling of the prison–industrial complex
 healthcare, housing, food and water acknowledged as an inalienable human right
 the expert fuckers who broke this world never get to speak again

Reception

Luciferian Towers was well received by contemporary music critics upon its release. At Metacritic, which assigns a normalized rating out of 100 to reviews from mainstream publications, the album received an average score of 78 based on 19 reviews.

In a four-star review for AllMusic, Paul Simpson concluded that "Like many of Godspeed's albums, Luciferian Towers might seem bleak or funereal on the surface, but ultimately, it's incredibly optimistic and hopeful. Perhaps out of necessity, the group seem more inspired here than they have in a while, and the result is arguably their best work since their 2000 opus  Lift Your Skinny Fists Like Antennas to Heaven." The album received a B+ from The A.V. Club Josh Modell, summing it up by calling the music, "incredible sounds to smash the state by". Sean T. Collins gave the album a rating of 7.3 out of 10 in the review for Pitchfork, stating "Godspeed's music is undergirded by its musicians' radical leftist politics (I mean, look at that press release), and that means there's hope rather than despair at its heart—a belief that collective struggle against our overlords is a battle worth fighting instead of a foregone conclusion to surrender to. It's this spirit that animates Luciferian Towers, the band's most melodic and powerfully positive-sounding album to date. One glance at the world around us offers a persuasive argument that it's the spirit we need."

Pretty Much Amazing reviewer Luke Fowler also praised the album, writing that "Luciferian Towers is a better album than Asunder. I'd venture that it's even better than 2012's 'Allelujah! Don't Bend! Ascend! by virtue of its interludes not being completely disposable. It's less bold than their earliest and best work (I wish they'd make another double LP one of these days), but it bodes well for their future, and stands as one of the best albums of the year."

Track listing

Compact disc and vinyl editions

Digital edition

Personnel

Godspeed You! Black Emperor
Thierry Amar – upright bass, bass guitar
David Bryant – electric guitar, MG-One
Aidan Girt – drums
Timothy Herzog – drums 
Efrim Manuel Menuck – electric guitar, organ, OP-1
Michael Moya – electric guitar
Mauro Pezzente – bass guitar
Sophie Trudeau – violin, organ

Guests on "Undoing a Luciferian Towers"
 Bonnie Kane – saxophone, flute, electronics
 Craig Pedersen – trumpet

Charts

References

2017 albums
Constellation Records (Canada) albums
Godspeed You! Black Emperor albums
Instrumental rock albums